In mathematics, the folded spectrum method (FSM) is an iterative method for solving large eigenvalue problems.
Here you always find a vector with an eigenvalue close to a search-value .  This means you can get a vector  in the middle of the spectrum without solving the matrix.

In contrast to the Conjugate gradient method, here the gradient calculates by twice multiplying matrix

Literature 
 
 
 
 https://web.archive.org/web/20070806144253/http://www.sst.nrel.gov/topics/nano/escan.html

Numerical linear algebra